Uzi Baram (born 6 April 1937) is an Israeli former politician, who served as a member of the Knesset between 1977 and 2001, and was Minister of Tourism and Minister of Internal Affairs in the 1990s.

Biography
Uzi Baram was born in Jerusalem during the Mandate era. His father, Moshe Baram, born in Zdolbuniv in the Russian Empire (today in Ukraine) in 1911, served as Minister of Labour and Minister of Welfare, and was a Knesset member for Mapai and the Alignment. His mother, Grazia, was born in Aleppo, Syria. Baram grew up in Jerusalem's Nahalat Ahim neighborhood. Baram earned a BA in political science and sociology from the Hebrew University of Jerusalem. During his studies, he was chairman of the Students Union.

Baram was elected to the Knesset in 1977 on the Alignment list, an election in which his father lost his seat. Re-elected in 1981, 1984, 1988 and 1992 (by which time the Alignment had become the Labor Party, he was appointed Minister of Tourism in Yitzhak Rabin's government in July 1992. In February 1995 he also became Minister of Internal Affairs, serving until June that year when David Libai was appointed to the post. When Shimon Peres formed a new government following Rabin's assassination, he remained Minister of Tourism.

Although he retained his seat in the 1996 elections, Likud formed the government and Baram lost his place in the cabinet. He was re-elected in 1999 on the One Israel list (an alliance of the Labor Party, Gesher and Meimad), but resigned from the Knesset in February 2001, and was replaced by Efi Oshaya.

His son is author Nir Baram

References

External links
 

1937 births
Living people
Alignment (Israel) politicians
Hebrew University of Jerusalem Faculty of Social Sciences alumni
Israeli Jews
Israeli Labor Party politicians
Jewish Israeli politicians
Jews in Mandatory Palestine
Members of the 9th Knesset (1977–1981)
Members of the 10th Knesset (1981–1984)
Members of the 11th Knesset (1984–1988)
Members of the 12th Knesset (1988–1992)
Members of the 13th Knesset (1992–1996)
Members of the 14th Knesset (1996–1999)
Members of the 15th Knesset (1999–2003)
Ministers of Internal Affairs of Israel
Ministers of Tourism of Israel
People from Jerusalem